Matthias Fekl (born 4 October 1977) is a French politician who served as Minister of the Interior in the government of Prime Minister Bernard Cazeneuve in 2017. A member of the Socialist Party, he was elected to the National Assembly in the second constituency of Lot-et-Garonne in 2012, retaining his seat until 2014, when he became Secretary of State for Foreign Trade, Tourism and French citizens abroad. In 2017, he briefly returned to Parliament for the remainder of his term.

Early life and education
Fekl was born on 4 October 1977 in Frankfurt, West Germany. His father is a German university professor and his mother is a French teacher. He grew up in West Berlin before moving to Paris, where he graduated from the Lycée Henri-IV. He later studied at various universities (Sciences Po, École normale supérieure de Lyon, École nationale d'administration).

Political career

Early political career
From 2010 to 2011, Fekl served as chief of staff to Jean-Pierre Bel, then president of the Socialist group in the Senate. When Bel became President of the Senate, Fekl served as his special adviser. Fekl was elected member of the National Assembly in the 2012 legislative election. During his time in Parliament, he was a member of the Committee on Legal Affairs. In 2012, Interior Minister Manuel Valls mandated Fekl with a report on immigration which was later submitted to Prime Minister Jean-Marc Ayrault.

Secretary of State for Foreign Trade

In 2014, Fekl was appointed to be Secretary of State for Foreign Trade at the Ministry of Foreign Affairs and International Development under the leadership of minister successive ministers Laurent Fabius and Jean-Marc Ayrault, succeeding Thomas Thévenoud. During his time in office, France opened a trade office in Tehran in September 2015, leading the charge of European countries angling for a share of the Iranian market after the Joint Comprehensive Plan of Action.

In October 2016, Fekl launched his own political movement, the Movement for the Life of Ideas and Alternatives (Mouvement pour la vie des idées et des alternatives, Movida). He also briefly belonged to the campaign team of Benoît Hamon for the 2017 presidential election.

Minister of the Interior
Fekl was appointed as Minister of the Interior on 21 March 2017, succeeding Bruno Le Roux, who was forced to resign after it was revealed that he had employed his two daughters, at the age of 15, as parliamentary assistants. In response to the March 2017 social unrest in French Guiana, Fekl and fellow cabinet member Ericka Bareigts were dispatched to the overseas French department by Prime Minister Cazeneuve. He ran for reelection to the National Assembly in the 2017 legislative election but was defeated by Alexandre Freschi, who stood for La République En Marche! (REM).

Other activities
 Terra Nova, Member of the Board of Directors

References

External links

 Official Twitter

1977 births
Living people
ENS Fontenay-Saint-Cloud-Lyon alumni
École nationale d'administration alumni
French interior ministers
Lycée Henri-IV alumni
Politicians from Berlin
Sciences Po alumni
Socialist Party (France) politicians
Deputies of the 14th National Assembly of the French Fifth Republic
German emigrants to France